Joachim von Düben (1708 – 27 January 1786) was a Swedish statesman and riksråd.

Joachim von Düben was the son of hofmarschall and kapellmeister Anders von Düben the Younger and Ulrica Friedenreich. Von Düben was elected as President of Privy Council Chancellery of Sweden in 1772, and was fired following the Coup of Gustav III.

In 1738, von Düben married Catharina Eleonora Temminck, daughter of Governor-General of the Dutch colony of Surinam, Hendrik Temminck.

von Düben was initially close to the court, in 1762 came into fierce conflict with Fredrik Carl Sinclair, his favored competitor who held the queen's trust. He now slipped more and more towards the Caps and was, as an apostate, extremely hated by his former like-minded people. Several times he was stopped by the monarchy when proposing a national council.

After an amendment to the constitution in 1766 which enabled the Riksdag to overcome such royal opposition, he was finally appointed to the Riksråd in 1766. However, he lost this task at the change of government after the victory of the Hats in 1769.

Re-elected to the Riksdag in 1772, as Chancellor and last head of government of the Age of Liberty, he was dismissed after Gustav III's coup and thereafter without political influence.

von Düben was first married to Catharina Eleonora Temming, daughter of the Dutch governor-general of the Dutch colony of Suriname. They had six children, including the headmistress and artist Fredrika Eleonora von Düben. He then remarried to Cornelia Florentina Hildebrand.

References

External links 

 Joachim von Düben – Svenskt biografiskt lexikon  (in Swedish)

Swedish nobility

1708 births
1786 deaths
18th-century Swedish politicians
Joachim
Swedish people of German descent
Swedish people of Dutch descent
Gustavian era people
Age of Liberty people
Barons of Sweden